Pirrinuan is a rural locality in the Western Downs Region, Queensland, Australia. In the  Pirrinuan had a population of 193 people.

Geography 
Karingal is a neighbourhood within the south of the locality.

Pirrinuan railway station is an abandoned railway station on an abandoned Jandowae railway line. It was on Dalby Jandowae Road.

Road infrastructure
The Dalby–Jandowae Road (State Route 82) runs through from south to north.

History 
Pirrinuan State School opened on 21 August 1911 and closed  circa 1963. It was on Dalby Jandowae Road to the immediate north-east of the railway station (approx ).

In the  Pirrinuan had a population of 193 people.

References 

Western Downs Region
Localities in Queensland